Jeremy Lee Wotherspoon (born October 26, 1976) is a Canadian speed skater, widely recognized as one of the greatest speedskating sprinters of all time.

In December 2003, Wotherspoon became the most successful male skater in World Cup history when he claimed the 49th victory of his career. He finished his career with a record 67 World Cup wins at 500 and 1,000 metres.

Wotherspoon broke the 500 m world record on three occasions. He broke the 1000 m world record seven times.

Career

Early career

Wotherspoon was born in Humboldt, Saskatchewan, but grew up in Red Deer, Alberta. There he first became involved in speedskating after signing up for a power skating class in an effort to improve his ice hockey abilities.  Initially, Wotherspoon competed in both short track and long track events. He eventually chose long track as a specialty and climbed through the junior ranks, moving to Calgary to train with the Canadian national team at the age of 17. Wotherspoon soon won medals on the World Cup circuit, with his first victories in 1997.

Wotherspoon dominated sprint events and held world records in both the 500 m and 1000 m distances. He is a four-time World Sprint Champion, taking the title four times in five years between 1999 and 2003, and a 13-time World Cup Overall Champion on the 500 m and the 1000 m. During the 1998 Winter Olympics in Nagano, Wotherspoon won a silver medal in the 500 m, despite being the favorite.

Four years later, at the 2002 Winter Olympics in Salt Lake City, Wotherspoon fell at the start of his run during the 500 m, and finished 13th in the 1000 m event. The next Olympic Games in Turin in 2006, he failed to reach the podium once again, placing 9th in the 500 m event and 11th in the 1000 m. Wotherspoon, disappointed, decided to spend time alone on Mausund, a remote Norwegian island near the Arctic Circle. When asked whether he was anxious over skating after a season away from the sport, he stated "I'm more interested to see how quickly I can get back up."

2010 Olympics and first retirement

Following his time in Norway, Wotherspoon set a world record in the 500 m event on November 9, 2007. However, he later suffered an arm injury while skating in the 2008–09 World Cup season. On December 27, 2009, Wotherspoon officially secured his spot for the 500 m and 1000 m events at the 2010 Winter Olympics in Vancouver after finishing first in the Canadian trials held at the Calgary Olympic Oval. Despite this, Wotherspoon placed 9th and 14th in the Olympic events, respectively.

Wotherspoon announced his retirement from speed skating on December 6, 2009, promising to do so following the Vancouver Olympics and the 2010 season end.

Comeback

Wotherspoon announced that he was returning to speedskating in June 2013 with the aim of competing at the 2014 Winter Olympics.  He failed, however, to qualify in his signature event, the 500 m sprint, and was not named to Canada's Olympic team.

Post-retirement

Following his initial retirement in 2010, Wotherspoon coached at an academy in Inzell, Germany, training skaters from countries without coaches, facilities or formal programs. He returned there after his 2014 comeback attempt, then moved to a developmental team in Norway. In April 2016 Wotherspoon became the sprint coach for Norway's national team, with the aim of ending that nation's three-decade Olympic medal drought in long track's sprint events.

Personal life

Wotherspoon was born in Humboldt, Saskatchewan, but grew up in Red Deer, Alberta. He is married to Canadian former speed skater and 2006 Olympian Kim Weger; the couple has a daughter, Ella.

Records

Personal bests

World records 

Source: SpeedSkatingStats.com.

From November 23, 1997, to January 29, 2012, Wotherspoon held the  world record for the sprint combination: the point summation of four races (2x500 m and 2x1000 m) skated consecutively within two days, like those calculated for the World Sprint Speed Skating Championships. He improved on his own record five times since. His fastest combination of 135.355 (34.03, 34.14, 1:07.34, 1:07.03), accomplished during World Cup races at the Utah Olympic Oval over three days in November 2007 was not an official world record but has still not been bettered as of March 2019.

Furthermore, until November 2015, nearly 6 years after his retirement, Wotherspoon had skated the six fastest laps (400 m) ever, the fastest of which was a 24.32 s lap in his first 1000 m race in Salt Lake City in November 2007.

See also
List of Canadian sports personalities

References

External links
 
 
 
 
 
 

1976 births
Living people
Canadian male speed skaters
Canadian people of Scottish descent
Medalists at the 1998 Winter Olympics
Olympic medalists in speed skating
Olympic silver medalists for Canada
Olympic speed skaters of Canada
Speed skaters at the 1998 Winter Olympics
Speed skaters at the 2002 Winter Olympics
Speed skaters at the 2006 Winter Olympics
Speed skaters at the 2010 Winter Olympics
Sportspeople from Humboldt, Saskatchewan
Sportspeople from Red Deer, Alberta